Siaatoutai Theological College is a theological seminary in Tonga. It was established in 1948 by the Free Wesleyan Church of Tonga, being split away from Tupou College. The College is a member of the South Pacific Association of Theological Schools, and offers a Bachelor of Divinity programme accredited by the same. , more than 190 students attend the college.

History 
The College was established in 1948 at Nafualu, which had been the location of Tupou College since its relocation from the capital city Nuku'alofa in 1921, under the patronage of Queen Sālote Tupou III. The site is of historical and cultural significance to the Tongans as it was once the domain of the famed Tu'i Ha'amea, Lo'au, who devised the royal drinking ceremony, the Taumafa Kava.

Prior to the establishment of Sia'atoutai, theological training was undertaken at Tupou College, where the principal, the Reverend A. Harold Wood, fulfilled the dual roles of secondary school executive and tertiary educator (with theological classes conducted in the evening, when the school day had ended). The Church at the time was still grappling with the challenges of having to train and equip a spontaneously enlarged body of clergy, following the reunion of the Wesleyan and Free Churches in 1924, and so, with the inauguration of a new theological institute, the Church realised one its long-awaited goals in seeking to improve the theoretical and practical competencies of its ministers and workers.

References

Universities and colleges in Oceania
Educational organisations based in Tonga
Methodism in Tonga
Educational institutions established in 1948
Protestant seminaries and theological colleges
1948 establishments in Tonga